This is a list of Roman Catholic missions in Africa.

 Augustinians of the Assumption
 Carmelites
 Catholic Medical Mission Board
 Catholic Missions of Africa Kenya
 Catholic Near East Welfare Association
 Catholic Relief Services
 Catholic World Missions
 Columban Missions
 Cross International Catholic Outreach
 Franciscan Missions
 Hospitaler Bros. St. John of God Missions	
 International Catholic Migration Commission 
 Jesuits
 Mary'’s Meals		
 Mercy Corps		
 Missionaries of Africa 
 Missionaries of the Poor
 Missionary Oblates				
 Missionary Sisters of Mary Immaculate
 Missionary Sisters of Our Lady of Africa
 Missionary Society of St. Paul
 Missionhurst	
 Paris Evangelical Missionary Society, PEMS or, in French, Société des Missions Evangéliques de Paris		
 Pontifical Mission Societies
 Salesian of Don Bosco Missions
 Society of African Missions
 Sudan Relief Fund

See also
 Christianity in Africa
 List of Christian Missionaries
 List of converts to Christianity
 List of Protestant mission societies in Africa
 Mission (Christian)
 Timeline of Christian missions

Roman Catholic missions in Africa
C
M